Yang Zi may refer to:

Yang Zhu, also known as Yang Zi (Master Yang), ancient Chinese philosopher
Yang Xiong (author), also known as Yang Zi (Master Yang), Han dynasty scholar
Yang Zi (poet) (born 1963), Chinese poet
Yang Zili (born ca. 1971), also known as Yang Zi, Chinese freelance journalist
Yang Zi (actress) (born 1992), Chinese actress

Sportspeople
Yang Zi (table tennis) (born 1984), Singaporean table tennis player
Yang Zi (footballer) (born 1989), Chinese football player 
Yang Zi (tennis) (born 1993), Chinese tennis player

See also
Yangzi (disambiguation)